Does America Need a Foreign Policy?: Toward a Diplomacy for the 21st Century is a 2001 book by Henry Kissinger.

Editions
Simon and Schuster, New York, United States 

2001 non-fiction books
Books by Henry Kissinger
Simon & Schuster books